Wokenwell was a six-part British television crime drama series, first broadcast on 18 May 1997, that aired on ITV. The series was produced by LWT and created by screenwriter Bill Gallagher. The series centred on three policemen and their wives living in the fictional northern England town of Wokenwell. The series was filmed on location in and around the picturesque West Yorkshire village of Marsden.

The series starred Ian McElhinney, Celia Imrie, Nicholas Gleaves, Lesley Dunlop, Jason Done and Nicola Stephenson, with Bryan Pringle and John Malcolm also appearing in supporting roles. On 1 April 1997 a TV-tie in novel, written by Graeme Grant, under the pseudonym Tom McGregor, was released as a prelude to the series.

Cast
 Ian McElhinney as Sgt. Duncan Bonney 
 Celia Imrie as June Bonney
 Nicholas Gleaves as PC Rudy Whiteside 
 Lesley Dunlop as Lucky Whiteside 
 Jason Done as PC Brian Rainford 
 Nicola Stephenson as Fran Rainford 
 Bryan Pringle as Sadly Stan Potter
 Matthew Knowles as Barry Whiteside 
 Samantha Bishop as Natalie Perrin
 Kate Collings	as Melissa Price
 Nicola Lumb as Vicky Cullings
 John Malcolm as Doc Seaden

Episodes

References

External links

 

1997 British television series debuts
1997 British television series endings
1990s British drama television series
Fictional populated places in England
ITV television dramas
ITV miniseries
1990s British television miniseries
Television series by ITV Studios
London Weekend Television shows
English-language television shows
Television shows set in West Yorkshire